George L. Radosevich (January 25, 1928 – April 4, 2016) was an American football defensive back who played for the Baltimore Colts. He played college football at the University of Pittsburgh, having previously attended Brentwood High School in Brentwood, Pennsylvania. He died of heart failure on April 4, 2016.

References

People from Allegheny County, Pennsylvania
American football offensive linemen
American people of Serbian descent
Pittsburgh Panthers football players
Baltimore Colts players
Players of American football from Pennsylvania
1928 births
2016 deaths